History is the study of the past. When used as the name of a field of study, history refers to the study and interpretation of the record of humans, families, and societies as preserved primarily through written sources. This is a list of history topics covered on English Wikipedia:


A

 Abkhazia, History of
 Adena culture
 Afghanistan, History of
 Africa, History of
 Age of Discovery
 Age of Enlightenment
 Age of Exploration
 Age of Reason
 Age of Sail
 Agriculture, History of
 Akrotiri and Dhekelia, History of
 Åland, History of
 Albania, History of
 Alfred the Great
 Algeria, History of
 Alternative history
 American history
 American Revolution
 American Samoa, History of
 Ancient China
 Ancient Egypt
 Ancient Greece
 Ancient history
 Ancient India
 Ancient Japan
 Ancient Korea
 Ancient Rome
 Ancient warfare
 Andorra, History of
 Angola, History of
 Anguilla, History of
 Antigua and Barbuda, History of
 Archaeology
 Architecture, History of
 Argentina
 Armenia, History of
 Art history
 Aruba, History of
 Ascension Island, History of
 Asia, History of
 Assyria
 Atomic Age
 Australia, History of
Prehistory
Before 1788
1788–1850
1851–1900
1901–1945
Since 1945
 Austria, History of
 Aviation history
 Axial Age
 Azerbaijan, History of
 Aztecs

B
 Bahamas, History of the
 Bahrain, History of
 Bangladesh, History of
East Pakistan
 Battle
 Babylonia
 Banking, History of
 Belarus, History of
 Belgium, History of
 Bias
 Bibliography of history
 Biography
 Botswana, History of
 Brazil, History of
Colonial
Empire
 Britain, History of
Ancient
Roman
Empire
 Bronze Age
 Business history
 Byzantine Empire

C

 Cambodia, History of
 Cameroon, History of
 Canada, History of
 First Nations
 Carolingian Renaissance
 Carolingian writing
 Carolingian art
 Carolingian architecture
 Carolingian music
 Chad, History of
 China, History of
Xia Dynasty
Shang Dynasty
Zhou Dynasty
Qin Dynasty
Han Dynasty
Three Kingdoms
First Jin Dynasty
Sixteen Kingdoms
Southern and Northern Dynasties
Sui Dynasty
Tang Dynasty
Five Dynasties and Ten Kingdoms period
Liao Dynasty
Song Dynasty
Western Xia Dynasty
Second Jin Dynasty
Yuan Dynasty
Ming Dynasty
Qing Dynasty
Republic of
People's Republic of
 Chile, History of
 Chronology
 Cold War
 Colombia, History of
 Colonialism, History of
 Contemporary history
 Congo, Democratic Republic
 Congo, Republic
 Copper Age
 Croatia, History of
 Crusades
First
Second
Third
Livonian
German
Fourth
Albigensian
Children's
Fifth
Prussian
Sixth
Seventh
Shepherds' 1251
Eighth
Ninth
Aragonese
Shepherds' 1320
Alexandrian
Nicopolis
Northern
Hussite
Varna
Otranto
Ottoman-Habsburg wars
Lepanto
Vienna
 Cuba, History of
Revolution
 Cultural history
 Cyprus, History of
 Czech Republic, History of

D
 Dark Ages (historiography)
 Death of Alexander the Great
 Decolonization
 Denmark, History of
 Digital Age
 Divine Right of Kings

E
 Economic history
 Education, History of
 Egypt, History of
Ancient
Achaemenid
Ptolemaic
Roman
Arab
Ottoman
Muhammad Ali dynasty
Modern
 Eighty Years' War
 History of England
Reformation
Civil War
 Ethiopia, History of
 Europe, History of
European Union
 Environmental history

F
 Falkland Islands, History of
Fashion design, History of
 Finland, History of
 France, History of
Prehistoric
Gaul
Roman Gaul
Frankish Empire
In the Middle Ages
in the Early Modern Period
Revolution
First Republic
First Empire
Bourbon Restoration
July Monarchy
Second Republic
Second Empire
Third Republic
Vichy France
Provisional Government
Fourth Republic
Fifth Republic
 Forest history

G
 Gender history
 Genealogy
 Germany, History of
 Germanic tribes
 Migration period
 Frankish Empire
 Merovingian Dynasty
 Carolingian Dynasty
 Holy Roman Empire
 Early modern history of Germany
 German confederation
 North German Federation
 German Empire
 Weimar Republic
 Nazi Germany
 Partitions of Germany
 East Germany
 West Germany
 Reunification of Germany
 Ghana, History of
 Great Depression
 in Australia
 in Canada
 in France
 in Latin America
 in the Netherlands
 in South Africa
 in the United Kingdom
 in the United States
 Greece, History of
 Guatemala, History of
 Gunpowder warfare

H
 Haiti, History of
 Historical document
 Historical method
 Historical sociology
 Historicism
 Historiography
 History
 History from below
 Holocaust, the
 Holy Roman Empire
 Honduras, History of
 Hong Kong, History of
 Human history
 Hundred Years' War
 Hungary, History of
 Huns

I
 Iceland, History of
 Ideas, History of
 Imperialism
 Inca Empire
 India, History of
Middle kingdoms
Mughal Empire
British Raj
Republic
 Indochina Wars
 Indonesia, History of
 Indus Valley civilization
 Industrial Age
 Industrial Revolution
 Industrial warfare
 Information Age
 The Internet, History of
 Inquisition
 Iran, History of
Revolution
 Ireland, History of
Early history of Ireland
Norman Ireland
 Iron Age
 Italy, History of

J
 Jamaica, History of
 Japan, History of
Ancient
Tokugawa shogunate
Imperial
 Jersey, History of
 Jordan, History of

K
 Kazakhstan, History of
 Kenya, History of
 Korea, History of
Ancient
North
South
Korean War
 Kosovo, History of
 King Arthur

L
 Labor history
 Landscape history
 Laos, History of
 Latvia, History of
 League of Nations
 Lebanon, History of
 Lesotho, History of
 LGBT history
 Liberia, History of
 Libya, History of
 Liechtenstein, History of
 Lithuania, History of
 Local history
 Luxembourg, History of

M
 Malaysia, History of
 Maritime history
 Maya civilization
 Medicine, History of
 Medieval warfare
 Meiji Restoration
 Mesoamerica
 Mesolithic period
 Mesopotamia
 Mexico, History of
 Middle Ages
 Migration
 Military Frontier
 Military history
 Prehistoric warfare
 Ancient warfare
 Medieval warfare
 Early Modern warfare
 Industrial warfare
 Modern warfare
 Minoan civilization
 Modern history
 Mongol Empire
 Mozambique, History of
 Music, History of
 Prehistoric music
 Ancient music
 Early music
 Medieval music
 Renaissance music
 Baroque music
 Common practice period
 Classical
 Romantic music
 20th century music

N
 Napoleonic Wars
 Nationalism
 Natural history
 Naval history
 Neolithic period
 Nepal, History
 New Imperialism
 New Zealand, History of
 Normans
 North America, History of

O
 Oceania, History of
 Oman, History of
 Oral history
 Ottoman Empire

P

 Pakistan, History of
 Palaeography
 Palau, History of
 Paleolithic period
 Palestine, History of
 Panama, History of
 Papua New Guinea, History of
 Paraguay, History of
 Parliamentary procedure, History of
 Pearl Harbor
 People's history
 Periodization
 Persian Empire
 Peru, History of
Viceroyalty
War of Independence
 Philippines, History of
 Philosophy of history
 Poland, History of
Under the Piasts
Under the Jagiellons
First Republic
Partitions
Second Republic
People's Republic
 Political history
 Political science, History of
 Political thought, History of
 Portugal, History of
Empire of
Civil War
 Prehistory
 Prehistoric art
 Prehistoric music
 Prehistoric warfare
 Protohistory
 Pseudohistory
 Psychohistory

Q
 Qatar, History of
 Quantitative history

R

 Rail transport, History of
 Religion, History of
 Renaissance
 Restoration (disambiguation),
Bourbon
English
European
Meiji
Spanish
Swiss
 Revolution,
1848
American
Communist
Cuban
French
Industrial
Russian
Singing (Latvia)
 Road transport, History of
 Romani people, History of
 Romania, History of
 Rome,
Ancient
Empire of
Fall of
Republic of
 Russia, History of
Tsardom
Empire
Revolution (1917)
USSR
post-Soviet Russia
 Rwanda, History of

S
 Science, History of
 Scotland, History of
 Scramble for Africa
 Serbia, History of
 Slavery, History of
 Social history
 Socialism, History of
 Source, Primary
 Source, Secondary
 South Africa, History of
 South America, History of
 South India, History of
 Space Age
 Spain, History of
Empire of
Civil War
 Sport, History of
 Stone Age
 Sweden, History of
 Switzerland, History of
 Syria, History of

T
 Taiping Revolution
 Telecommunication, History of
 Thailand, History of
 Three-age system
 Trade, History of
 Transport, History of
 Turkey, History of

U
 Uganda, History of
 Ukraine, History of
 United States, History of
 Diplomatic history
 Military history
 Technological and industrial history
 Economic history
 Cultural history
 Women's history
 Native American history
 Timeline
 Pre-Columbian era
 Colonial period
 American Revolutionary War
 1776–1789
 1789–1849
 1849–1865
 1865–1918
 1918–1945
 1945–1964
 1964–1980
 1980–1991
 1991–present
 United Kingdom, History of
 Universal history
 Uruguay, History of
 USSR, History of the
 Uzbekistan, History of

V
 Vanuatu, History of
 Vatican City, History of
 Venezuela, History of
 Venice, History of
 Vietnam, History of
American War
 Vikings
 Viking Age

W
 War
 Warfare, Ancient
 Western fashion, History of
 Women's history
 World history
 World War I
 World War II

 Writing, History of

X
 Xinhai Revolution

Y
 Yemen, History of

Z
 Zambia, History of
 Zanzibar, History of
 Zimbabwe, History of

History topics